Jack Driscoll (born April 1, 1997) is an American football offensive tackle and guard for the Philadelphia Eagles of the National Football League (NFL). He played college football at UMass and Auburn and was drafted by the Eagles in the fourth round of the 2020 NFL Draft.

College career
A 2-star recruit, Driscoll committed to UMass over an offer from Army. He played at UMass for three years before transferring to Auburn for his final two seasons as a graduate transfer. He won the starting job at right tackle and spent two years playing in that position in the SEC. He played in the East-West All-Star Game.

Professional career
Driscoll was drafted by the Philadelphia Eagles in the fourth round with the 145th overall pick of the 2020 NFL Draft. During his professional debut against the Washington Football Team on September 13, 2020, Driscoll left the game with an undisclosed injury. He was placed on injured reserve on December 18, 2020, after suffering a knee injury in Week 14. He finished the season with four starts at right tackle.

On September 2, 2021, Driscoll was placed on injured reserve. He was activated on October 2. He was placed back on injured reserve on November 30.

Personal life
Driscoll's father, John played at New Hampshire and was a 12th-round draft pick by the Buffalo Bills in 1989.

References

External links
UMass Minutemen bio
Auburn Tigers bio

1997 births
Living people
People from Madison, Connecticut
Isenberg School of Management alumni
University of Massachusetts Amherst alumni
Players of American football from Connecticut
Sportspeople from New Haven County, Connecticut
American football offensive guards
American football offensive tackles
UMass Minutemen football players
Auburn Tigers football players
Philadelphia Eagles players